Makarios Avenue is an avenue in the centre of Nicosia, Cyprus which covers a distance of . The Street starts from the Junction of Evagoras Avenue until Aglandjia Avenue and is named after the first President of Cyprus Archbishop Makarios III. In Colonial times Makarios Avenue was named Pluto Street. and was the main route to Limassol, it was lined with residential buildings such as the Lyssiotis Mansion built in 1928 and is now the Head Office of the National Bank of Greece in Cyprus.  The area has been transformed into a commercial district with many of the original buildings demolished to make way for shops and office blocks. Makariou Avenue is parallel to Stasikratous Street and Themistokli Dervi Avenue .

Shops
The most prominent features of Makariou avenue are the hundreds of various fashion shops, boutiques, high end international department stores and City Plaza, the biggest Cypriot department store in the city centre. Makariou Avenue is also home to the Galaxias Arcade the largest Stoa in the city centre of Nicosia, which has facilities from bars, restaurants, a virgin music megastore to Hairstylists.

Gallery

References

Streets in Nicosia
Economy of Cyprus